Luigi Bongiovanni (1866–1941) was an Italian general. He had been a governor of Cyrenaica from December 1922 to May 1924.

During the battle of Caporetto in World War I, he commanded VII corps of the Italian 2nd Army.  Before that he participated in Boxer Rebellion, then in the Italo-Turkish War.

People from Reggio Emilia
Italian colonial governors and administrators
1866 births
1941 deaths
Italian military personnel of the Italo-Turkish War
Italian military personnel of World War I
Recipients of the Order of Saints Maurice and Lazarus
Recipients of the Silver Medal of Military Valor
Knights of the Military Order of Savoy
Italian generals
Members of the Senate of the Kingdom of Italy
Italian military personnel of the Boxer Rebellion